Abu Hamid al-Gharnati (full name: Abu Hamid Muhammad ibn Abd al-Rahman ibn Sulayman ibn Rabi al-Māzinī al-Qaysi; c. 1080 – 1170) was an Andalusian traveller from Granada who travelled around eastern and central Europe, and wrote about his travels in an Arabic travelogue, Tuhfat al-Albab ("Gift of Hearts"). He also wrote about spectacular places and things in al-Mu’rib ‘an ba’d ‘aja’ib al-Maghreb (Praise of Some of the Wonders of North Africa), and established a genre of books of wonder in Arabic. Many of the things he saw and wrote about were embellished with fantastic details.

Al-Gharnati's family is thought to have fled Granada to escape the reign of the Almoravid emir Yusuf ibn Tashfin. He travelled from Iberia to Egypt and Syria in 1106, reaching Alexandria in 1115 via Sardinia and Sicily, writing about Mount Etna. He moved to Baghdad in 1123. He lived with the Volga Bulgarians from 1131 to 1150 and travelled to Hungary, where he worked as an advisor in the court of King Géza II. He moved through Kiev to Baghdad in 1154 and lived in Mosul from 1161, Aleppo from 1165, and finally Damascus from 1169.

References

External links 
 Scanned version of Tuhfat al-albab (in Arabic)
 Travelers of Al-Andalus. Part 2 by Ingrid Bejarano Escanilla (2015) from Aramco World 66(2).

1080s births
1170 deaths
12th-century explorers
12th-century writers from al-Andalus
Travel writers of the medieval Islamic world